The Kingdom of Damot (Amharic: ዳሞት) was a medieval kingdom in what is now western Ethiopia. The territory was positioned below the Blue Nile. It was a powerful state that forced the Sultanate of Showa (also called Shewa) to pay tributes. It also annihilated the armies of the Zagwe dynasty that were sent to subdue its territory. Damot conquered several Muslim and Christian territories. The Muslim state Showa and the new Christian state under Yekuno Amlak formed an alliance to counter the influence of Damot in the region.

History
Damot's history as an independent entity ended after the conquest of the region by Emperor Amda Seyon in the fourteenth century and remained under the Solomonic dynasty's influence afterwards. Originally located south of the Abay and west of the Muger River, under the pressure of Oromo attacks the rulers were forced to resettle north of the Abay in southern Gojjam between 1574 and 1606.

The kings, who bore the title Motalami, resided in a town which, according to the hagiography of Tekle Haymanot, was called Maldarede. The kingdom was reduced to smaller size and the name became the Kingdom of Wolayta . Their territory extended east beyond the Muger as far as the Jamma.

References

Further reading
 
 

Former monarchies of Africa
History of Ethiopia
Former countries in Africa